Pivot Gang is a hip hop collective of independent rappers based out the west side of Chicago. The group originated from the Austin neighborhood in 2011. The four founders consist of brothers Saba (born Tahj Malik Chandler) and Joseph Chilliams (AKA Jerrel Chandler), their cousin John Walt (Walter Long), and their high school friend MFnMelo (AKA Logan Yutters). Other artists who commonly collaborate with the group include Lucki Eck$, Martin $ky, Ausar, Noname, and DJ Damnage, along with others.

History
Saba is the most well-known rapper in the group, and is known as the front-man of Pivot Gang. Most of the music made by the group has a diverse sound, ranging from smooth soulful samples to more aggressive, rapid drill beats. MFnMelo explains in an interview with the Chicagoist, "a lot of the Pivot shit has that smooth kind of chord tradition that's influenced by New York soul, but it will just go harder. I'll put some drill drums over it. Some of my music has that same creative process, but a lot of it goes into a soulful, hip-hop-y route". The group has released a mixtape titled JIMMY on October 15, 2013.

Their debut album You Can't Sit With Us was released on April 19, 2019, with guest appearances from Smino, Kari Faux, Mick Jenkins, Jean Deaux, Femdot, Sylvan LaCue and Benjamin Earl Turner.

On August 17, 2021, the group announced the passing of Squeak, who was fatally shot in Austin while visiting his grandmother.

Members
Saba
 Joseph Chilliams
 MFn Melo
 Dam Dam
 Frsh Waters
 daedaePIVOT
 Daoud
 John Walt (deceased)
 squeakPIVOT (deceased)

Discography

Studio albums

Mixtapes

EPs

References

American hip hop groups
Alternative hip hop groups
Hip hop collectives
Musical groups from Chicago
Musical groups established in 2013
2013 establishments in Illinois